Dani's Castle is a British children's comedy-drama which started airing on the CBBC Channel and ABC3 on 17 January 2013. It stars Dani Harmer, Shannon Flynn, Kieran Alleyne, Lorenzo Rodriguez, Niall Wright, Jordan Brown, Richard Wisker, Toby Murray, Jessica Forrest and Lucy Hutchinson. It's a spin-off of Dani's House. In Series 3, the show is informally titled Rich Jimmy & Kait's Castle, due to Dani Harmer's exit at the end of Series 2.

Series overview

Episodes

Series 1 (2013)

Series 2 (2013–14)

Series 3 (2015)

References

Lists of British children's television series episodes
episodes